Jeff Rickard is currently the Program Director and Morning Show Host at Emmis Communications’ all-sports radio station, WFNI, in Indianapolis, Indiana.

Career 
Rickard started with Emmis as a part-time host and programming advisor before being tapped to take over programming duties full time in August of 2018.  Along with former Colts’ lineman and veteran radio host Joe Staysniak, Rickard began hosting the Fan Morning Show in May of 2019.   

Since Rickard has served as the program director, WFNI has consistently increased its ratings share and is now a consistent top performer across both men 25-54 in the Winter 2021 Nielsen ratings.  

Rickard has done both radio and television throughout his career with his last television stint coming as part of the now defunct Comcast Network (CN8).  Jeff hosted a nightly, half-hour news, highlight and talk show which emanated from a studio in Boston but was available to all Comcast subscribers throughout the eastern United States. 

Prior to joining WFNI, Rickard has hosted shows regularly on a number of Sirius XM’s sports channels, including NFL Radio, ESPNU, MLB Network Radio, Mad Dog Sports Radio and Fantasy Sports radio.  He has served as the host of NFL Radio’s “The Sunday Kickoff” during the NFL season for the past five years and is the host of College Football Overtime on ESPNU.

Jeff was also the radio host on ESPN Radio’s Gamenight, along with Doug Gottlieb, Freddie Coleman and John Seibel where the team covered nightly sports action, discussed high profile issues and interviewed the biggest names in sports.  Prior to his stint at ESPN Radio, Rickard hosted his own daily show on Sporting News Radio as part of a lineup that included James Brown, Tim Brando, and Bruce Murray.

Rickard’s first major programming job came in Salt Lake City where he led KKFN to consistent ratings and revenue success.  The station was the radio home of the Utah Jazz and Jeff served as the team’s radio studio host for road games and the television studio host for the final three years of the Jazz’ Stockton and Malone era.

He went to Salt Lake City after working in his hometown of Denver as a morning show host Monday through Fridays while performing as the studio host for both the Denver Nuggets and Colorado Avalanche. 

Rickard has done play-by-play for college football and basketball on Fox Sports Rocky Mountain, MLS soccer for the Colorado Rapids, was the voice of WNBA’s Utah Starzz, and worked with countless other entities on the professional, collegiate and amateur level.

In 2014, Rickard was given the prestigious “Distinguished Alumni” award by Colorado Mesa University where he had studied Broadcast Journalism while also playing on the football team.

Jeff has also been recognized by Richard Deitsch of SI.com as a “national radio personality of the year” in both 2006 and 2007.

Jeff attended Mesa State College in 1985 where he was a member of the football team that played
for two NAIA championships. He resides in Indiana with his wife and his two sons.

References

 
 SI.com's 2006 Media Awards
 SI.com's 2007 Media Awards

External links
 Jeff Rickard Broadcasting Reel
 Jeff Rickard Radio Reel

Year of birth missing (living people)
Living people
American sports announcers
American sports radio personalities
ESPN Radio